The North Branch Raritan River is a tributary of the Raritan River in central New Jersey.

The North Branch Raritan River rises in Morris County, in eastern Mendham Borough rising out of Raritan Pond, and flows generally southward into Somerset County, around the southern end of the Watchung Mountains. At its end, it forms the border between Bridgewater and Branchburg Townships, and upon reaching the border of Hillsborough Township, joins the South Branch Raritan River to form the main Raritan River, which generally flows eastward from that point.  This area where the branches converge was called "Tucca-Ramma-Hacking" by the Lenape, meaning the flowing together of water.  It was called "Two Bridges" by the early European settlers, after a set of bridges built in 1733 that met at a small island (the island has washed away over time) on the North Branch.  Today the area is generally referred to as "The Confluence".  In the 1970s, the state discussed plans for a Raritan Confluence Reservoir, which have been shelved due to acquisition costs.

Both North and South branches of the Raritan run nearly parallel southwards, east and west of one another, but receive their names from the direction each one flows from at their confluence.

Gallery

Tributaries
 Black River
Burnett Brook
Chambers Brook
Chamber's Brook
Clucas Brook
India Brook
Larger Brook
 Lamington River
McVickers Brook
Middle Brook (Bedminster)
Mine Brook
Moggy Brook
Peapack Brook
Penns Brook
Stewart Brook

See also
 List of rivers of New Jersey
 List of crossings of the Raritan River

References

External links
 
 U.S. Geological Survey: NJ stream gaging stations

Rivers of Morris County, New Jersey
Tributaries of the Raritan River
Rivers of New Jersey
Rivers of Somerset County, New Jersey